The Przemyśl natural gas field is a Polish gas field that was discovered in 1958. It began production in 1960. The total proven reserves of the Przemyśl gas field are around 741 billion cubic feet (21×109m³).

References

Natural gas fields in Poland